Stian Rasch (born 10 March 1987) is a Norwegian footballer who played as a midfielder.

Career
He started his youth career in Asker before joining Lyn. He was in the first-team squad for two seasons, but never got to play in Tippeligaen. Having been loaned back to Asker in 2006, he joined Hønefoss ahead of the 2007 season. Another spell in Asker followed, then Strømmen before joining Mjøndalen in 2014. When they won promotion, Rasch could then finally make his debut on the highest tier in 2015.

Following two more years in Strømmen he joined fifth-tier Heggedal IL.

References

External links
 

1987 births
Living people
People from Asker
Norwegian footballers
Lyn Fotball players
Asker Fotball players
Hønefoss BK players
Strømmen IF players
Mjøndalen IF players
Eliteserien players
Norwegian First Division players
Association football midfielders
Sportspeople from Viken (county)